Ruddy Cornielle was a long-distance runner who represented the Dominican Republic at the Olympics. He competed in the men's 5000 and 10,000 meters at the 1984 Summer Olympics.

References

Year of birth missing (living people)
Living people
Athletes (track and field) at the 1984 Summer Olympics
Dominican Republic male long-distance runners
Olympic athletes of the Dominican Republic
Place of birth missing (living people)